Paris' law (also known as the Paris–Erdogan equation) is a crack growth equation that gives the rate of growth of a fatigue crack. The stress intensity factor   characterises the load around a crack tip and the rate of crack growth is experimentally shown to be a function of the range of stress intensity  seen in a loading cycle. The Paris equation is
        
The stress intensity factor range has been found to correlate the rate of crack growth from a variety of different conditions and is the difference between the maximum and minimum stress intensity factors in a load cycle and is defined as

Being a power law relationship between the crack growth rate during cyclic loading and the range of the stress intensity factor, the Paris–Erdogan equation can be visualized as a straight line on a log-log plot, where the x-axis is denoted by the range of the stress intensity factor and the y-axis is denoted by the crack growth rate.

The equation gives the growth for a single cycle. Single cycles can be readily counted for constant-amplitude loading. Additional cycle identification techniques such as rainflow-counting algorithm need to be used to extract the equivalent constant-amplitude cycles from a variable-amplitude loading sequence.

History 
In a 1961 paper, P. C. Paris introduced the idea that the rate of crack growth may depend on the stress intensity factor. Then in their 1963 paper, Paris and Erdogan indirectly suggested the equation with the aside remark "The authors are hesitant but cannot resist the temptation to draw the straight line slope 1/4 through the data" after reviewing data on a log-log plot of crack growth versus stress intensity range.  The Paris equation was then presented with the fixed exponent of 4.

Domain of applicability

Stress ratio 
Higher mean stress is known to increase the rate of crack growth and is known as the mean stress effect. 
The mean stress of a cycle is expressed in terms of the stress ratio  which is defined as

or ratio of minimum to maximum stress intensity factors. In the linear elastic fracture regime,  is also equivalent to the load ratio

The Paris–Erdogan equation does not explicitly include the effect of stress ratio, although equation coefficients can be chosen for a specific stress ratio.  Other crack growth equations such as the Forman equation do explicitly include the effect of stress ratio, as does the Elber equation by modelling the effect of crack closure.

Intermediate stress intensity range 
The Paris–Erdogan equation holds over the mid-range of growth rate regime, but does not apply for very low values of approaching the threshold value , or for very high values approaching the material's fracture toughness, .

Long cracks 
Because the size of the plastic zone  is small in comparison to the crack length,  (here,  is yield stress), the approximation of small-scale yielding applies, enabling the use of linear elastic fracture mechanics and the stress intensity factor. Thus, the Paris–Erdogan equation is only valid in the linear elastic fracture regime, under tensile loading and for long cracks.

References

Materials science
Fracture mechanics
Mechanical failure
Mechanical failure modes
Solid mechanics